Hypostomus surinamensis is a species of catfish in the family Loricariidae. It is native to South America, where it occurs in the Suriname River basin in Suriname, with its specific epithet indicating both the country and river system it can be found in. The species reaches 16.5 cm (6.5 inches) in standard length and is believed to be a facultative air-breather.

References 

surinamensis
Fish described in 1968
Catfish of South America
Fish of Suriname
Fish of South America